"Jesus and Jones" is a song recorded by American country music artist Trace Adkins. It was released to radio on January 19, 2016, as the lead single to his debut album for Wheelhouse Records, and his fifteenth overall, Something's Going On. The song was written by Tyler Farr, Jim McCormick, and Casey Beathard.

Content
The song discusses Trace being "In a War" since he was a kid trying to be like Jesus and Country Music icon George Jones.

Music video
The music video was directed by Peter Zavadil and premiered on CMT, GAC & VEVO in 2016.

Critical reception
The website "For The Country Record" gave the song a negative review, saying "Now, please Trace fans, put down the pitch forks and torches, because, believe me, I’m actually on your side. I love Trace, always have. I love his deep, rich baritone, his confident personality, and his music, but let’s face facts; this song just isn’t up to par with his earlier music. This song is really just a result of lazy songwriting and bad production. You can’t blame it on the theme, because when done well, the theme is a great and relatable one. Plenty of artists have pulled it off beautifully; Big and Rich’s “Between Raising Hell and Amazing Grace”, Brian Randle's “Heaven and Hank”, Eric Church's “Like Jesus Does”, and Eric Lee Beddingfield's “The Gospel According to Jones”, all come to mind."

Chart performance

References

Songs about Jesus
Songs about musicians
Cultural depictions of country musicians
2016 songs
2016 singles
Trace Adkins songs
BBR Music Group singles
Songs written by Casey Beathard
Songs written by Tyler Farr
Songs written by Jim McCormick (songwriter)